California's 1st district may refer to:

 California's 1st congressional district
 California's 1st State Assembly district
 California's 1st State Senate district